Roman Pasevich (born 28 November 1999) is a Belarusian professional footballer who plays for Neman Grodno.

References

External links 
 
 

1999 births
Living people
Sportspeople from Vitebsk Region
Belarusian footballers
Association football midfielders
FC PMC Postavy players
FC Osipovichi players
FC Sputnik Rechitsa players
FC Lida players
FC Neman Grodno players
FC Smorgon players